The 2017 Szuperkupa (known as the TippMix Férfi Szuper Kupa for sponsorship reasons) was played on 22 December 2017 in Budapest, Hungary. With Szolnoki Dózsa winning both the 2016–17 Országos Bajnokság I championship and the 2016 Magyar Kupa, the game was played between Szolnoki Dózsa and the 2016 Magyar Kupa runners-up, Egri VK.

Teams

Squads

Head coach: Sándor Cseh, Jr.

Head coach: Norbert Dabrowski

Match

See also
2017–18 Országos Bajnokság I (National Championship of Hungary)
2017 Magyar Kupa (National Cup of Hungary)

References

External links
 Hungarian Water Polo Federaration

Seasons in Hungarian water polo competitions
Hungary
Szuperkupa Men